Fair Go is a New Zealand consumer affairs television programme hosted by Pippa Wetzell and Hadyn Jones. First aired in 1977, it is New Zealand's second longest-running local programme (after Country Calendar). It is also highest-rated programmes, frequently placed high in the New Zealand TV Guide list of most viewed programmes.

Fair Go features a mixture of investigative journalism and consumer affairs stories, based on the motto: "If you've been ripped off, short-changed or given the runaround and nobody wants to know...we do!"

Fair Go also held the annual Fair Go Ad Awards, in which the best and worst advertisements on New Zealand television are announced, and a competition to find the best 30-second video by New Zealand students is held.

Current reporters for the show, along with the two hosts, are Alistar Kata, Kaitlin Ruddock, Gill Higgins and Garth Bray.

Kevin Milne ONZM had worked on Fair Go from 1984 until 2010.

History
Fair Go began in 1977, the creation of presenter Brian Edwards and producer Peter Morritt. At the time it was seen as breaking new ground. It would not simply deal with consumer issues, it would investigate complaints from viewers and if those complaints were justified, it would name names. The biggest fear at the time was that the programme would attract huge lawsuits. Lawyers were hired to check every word on the script and the fears turned out to be groundless.

The other novel factor in the show was the high personality profile of its presenters and reporters. Other more recent high-profile presenters include Kevin Milne, Kerre McIvor (nee Woodham), Carol Hirschfeld, Rosalie Nelson, Liane Clarke, Greg Boyed and Simon Mercep.

When Fair Go began it was shown in two 10- to 12-week seasons each year. But with the popularity of the show, and the huge number of complaints sent into the programme, it was decided in 1993 to produce one long season which would run for almost the entire year.

As the show matured, the complaints it dealt with involved higher stakes. Fair Go's biggest cash settlement was for over $350,000. There have been several other settlements involving six figure sums. However, the show will go into battle for as little as one cent (and has), if the issue behind the dispute is an interesting one. Fair Go has always considered entertainment and humour as suitable partners for its more investigative work.

Previous presenters and reporters

Mary-Jane Aggett (now an executive producer of Fair Go)
Philip Alpers
Martyn Bates
Greg Boyed
Warwick Burke
Anna Burns-Francis
Judy Callingham
Matt Chisholm
Liane Clarke
Pete Cronshaw
Sharon Crosbie
Mark Crysell
Brett Dumbleton
Brian Edwards
Judith Fyfe
Mark Hannan
Gordon Harcourt
Spencer Jolly
Kim Hill
Carol Hirschfeld
Sandra Kailahi
Brodie Kane
Anna Kenna
Lisa Manning
Hugo Manson
Alison Mau
Gillian McGregor
Kerre McIvor
Eleisha McNeill
Simon Mercep
Libby Middlebrook
Amanda Millar
Kevin Milne
Rosalie Nelson
Alison Parr
Sean Plunket
Ruwani Perera
Manorma Ram
Raewyn Rasch
Anna Thomas
Naomi Trigg
Phil Vine
Simon Walker
Hannah Wallis (now a producer of Fair Go)
Kim Webby
Vicki Wilkinson-Baker
Barry Wilson
Erica Wood

Awards
In 1997, Fair Go was awarded a Bravo award by the New Zealand Skeptics for "poking a little of their irrepressible fun at alleged psychics providing lucky lotto numbers."

References

1970s New Zealand television series
1980s New Zealand television series
1990s New Zealand television series
2000s New Zealand television series
2010s New Zealand television series
2020s New Zealand television series
1977 New Zealand television series debuts
New Zealand television news shows
TVNZ 1 original programming
Consumer protection television series